Neills Creek Township is one of thirteen townships in Harnett County, North Carolina, United States. The township had a population of 5,921 according to the 2000 census. It is a part of the Dunn Micropolitan Area, which is also a part of the greater Raleigh–Durham–Cary Combined Statistical Area (CSA) as defined by the United States Census Bureau.

Geographically, Neills Creek Township occupies  in Harnett County.  Parts of the town of Lillington are now located in the township as well as the unincorporated community of Buies Creek, home of Campbell University, and Cape Fear.

The western boundary of Neills Creek township is bounded by Neills Creek, a tributary of the Cape Fear River.

References

Townships in Harnett County, North Carolina
Townships in North Carolina